Lorraine May Chapman (3 October 194231 January 1992), professionally known as Laurel Lea, was an Australian popular singer of the late 1950s and early 1960s. Lea appeared regularly on TV series, Bandstand, Six O'Clock Rock and Saturday Date. In 1974 and 1975 she toured throughout Australia with contemporaries Johnny O'Keefe, Johnny Devlin, Lonnie Lee and Barry Stanton. On 31 January 1992 Lea died of leukaemia.

Biography
Laurel Lea was born as Lorraine May Chapman. She was raised in Armidale, New South Wales by Con Lianos and was known as Lorraine Lianos. Con and his wife ran a travelling performance troupe and Laurel joined them from the age of 15. Her younger brother Doug (born ca. 1946) performed as a drummer, Little Rock Billy in the early 1960s. *edit via her son Mark in 2022.... Doug was not her bother, he was a dear friend and was nicknamed her "brother". In 1958 Lea signed with Leedon Records and was promoted by its founder, United States-born Lee Gordon.

At the end of 1960, Lea broke her jaw in a fall and was unable to sing for six months. She regularly appeared on TV series Bandstand, Saturday Date and Six O'Clock Rock. Lea was inspired by Brigitte Bardot, "I used to copy her mannerisms, and the way she opened her eyes and looked up like this". In October 1963 an audience of 40,000 attended a 2UW concert with the roster including Lea, Bee Gees, Lonnie Lee, Col Joye and Judy Stone. Lea recorded several singles, but had limited chart success.

In 1974 and 1975, she joined her contemporaries Johnny O'Keefe, Johnny Devlin, Lonnie Lee, Barry Stanton, Jade Hurley and Tony Brady in the Good Old Days of Rock 'n' Roll Tour which travelled throughout Australia. Lea returned to the updated Bandstand ‘76 show now hosted by Daryl Somers for a one off live performance.

She also had a band in the 1980s called Chockarock.

Personal life 
In 1960 or 1961 she married fellow Bandstand singer Kevin Todd (born ca. 1943), and the couple had a son Mark (born ca. 1962). The pair often performed duets and by December 1963 had signed with CBS Records. By November 1975, Lea had been married and divorced twice, "[she] has finished with two husbands and has a son of 13".

Laurel Lea died of leukemia on 31 January 1992 in Camperdown, New South Wales, aged 49.

Legacy 
From 12 October 2003, ABC-TV series, Love Is in the Air, was a five-part documentary on Australian pop music with "Episode 2: She's Leaving Home" describing female pop stars and how many travelled overseas to try to further their careers, Lea was described, "[a]ccomplished television regulars like Laurel Lea had the look, the sound and the talent". The program featured two of her tracks, "Alfie" and "Tomorrow".

Discography
Singles
 "I'll Save the Last Dance" (December 1960)
 "Bermuda" (1962)
 "Treasure of Your Love" / "What I Don't Know Won't Hurt Me" (CBS BA-221104, 1964)
 "I Shall Take My Leave" / "You're Closer to Me" (Parlophone A-8807 1969)

TELEVISION

Notes

References
Laurel Lea
Laurel Lee, Central Coast Leagues Club, Gosford 1978
TOM MIX OZ MUSIC: DOWNLOAD NO.368 – LAUREL LEA
It's a man's world
Bravenet Web Services

Reading

External links
 Laurel Lea photo, ca. 1966 held by State Library of Victoria via National Library of Australia.

1942 births
1992 deaths
Deaths from leukemia
Deaths from cancer in New South Wales
Australian women pop singers
CBS Records artists
20th-century Australian women singers